Henrietta Hyde, Countess of Rochester (née Boyle; 1646 – 12 April 1687) was an Anglo-Irish noblewoman. She was one of the Windsor Beauties painted by Sir Peter Lely.

She was born in Wiltshire, England to Sir Richard Boyle, 2nd Earl of Cork and Elizabeth Boyle, Countess of Cork. In 1665, she married Laurence Hyde, 1st Earl of Rochester, son of Edward Hyde, 1st Earl of Clarendon and Frances Aylesbury. Henrietta had four children.

Like most of the Boyle dynasty, who in the space of two generations had become almost all-powerful in the south of Ireland, Henrietta was strong-minded and acquisitive, and could be ruthless in asserting her rights. During the last two years of her life, when her husband was Chief Minister to his brother-in-law King James II,  Henrietta took full advantage of his power to claim every possible privilege. She clashed bitterly with her husband's niece, the future Queen Anne, over who should have the best apartments in Whitehall Palace. Anne, who could herself be a formidable opponent, complained bitterly of her aunt's "peevishness" to her.

Children 
 Lady Anne Hyde (died 25 January 1684/85), who married James Butler, 2nd Duke of Ormonde,
 Lady Mary Hyde, (1669-1709) who married Francis Seymour-Conway, 1st Baron Conway,
 Henry Hyde, 4th Earl of Clarendon (ca. 1672 – 10 December 1753), 
 Lady Henrietta Hyde (ca. 1677 – 30 May 1730), who married James Scott, Earl of Dalkeith.

Anne and the younger Henrietta were both noted for their wit and charm. Anne's early death, following a miscarriage, was a great blow to her parents, her husband and all her friends. Her sister Lady Dalkeith, despite many personal tragedies, is said to have retained her good nature and charm into her fifties.

References

Sources
Gregg, Edward   Queen Anne  Yale University Press  2001
 Chester, Joseph Lemuel. The Marriage, Baptismal, and Burial Registers of the Collegiate Church or Abbey of St. Peter, Westminster. (p. 329) 1876. googlebooks Retrieved 6 June 2008
"Henrietta, Countess of Rochester. (1833)", NYPL

1646 births
1687 deaths
English countesses
Daughters of Irish earls
Henrietta
Henrietta
17th-century English women
17th-century English people
Wives of knights